Huang Yong may refer to:

Huang Yong (murderer) (1974–2003), Chinese serial killer 
Huang Yong (footballer) (born 1978),  Chinese footballer